Mykola Lukash (19 December 1919 in Krolevets – 29 August 1988 in Kyiv) was a well-known Ukrainian literary translator, theorist and lexicographer. He knew more than 20 languages. Many literary works were successfully translated from the majority of these languages and introduced to the Ukrainian literature by him.

A literary prize, Ars Translationis, was instituted by Vsesvit in 1989 to commemorate Lukash.

Lukash was born into a family of teachers. From childhood he picked up foreign languages with ease. He began studying at the Faculty of History of the Kyiv State University, but his studies were interrupted by the Second World War. He fought in the Soviet Army from 1943.

In 1947 after graduating from the Institute of Foreign Languages in Kharkiv, Lukash worked as a teacher of foreign languages. He then became head of the Department of Poetry for Vsesvit.

Lukash was blessed with phenomenal linguistic talents and had an extraordinarily wide knowledge of foreign literature. He is considered to have been one of the most outstanding Ukrainian translators, translating literary works from 20 languages.

He was most prolific during the relatively favourable twenty-year period between 1953 and 1973, when he translated Goethe’s Faust, Flaubert’s Madame Bovary, the poetry of Schiller, Boccaccio’s Decameron and many other works. He was a member of the Union of Writers of Ukraine from 1956 and played an active role in Ukrainian literary life.

Lukash always gave moral support to writers who were being oppressed. Following the arrest of Ivan Dziuba, which was caused by the publication of his work Internationalism or Russification? in London, Lukash sent a letter to the Head of the Presidium of the Verkhovna Rada of the Ukrainian SSR, the Head of the Ukrainian Supreme Court and the General Prosecutor of the Ukrainian SSR with a copy to the Presidium of the Administration of the Union of Writers of Ukraine, in which he disagreed with the court ruling, calling it unjust, and protested against the expulsion of Ivan Dziuba from the Union. Lukash went as far as suggesting that he serve the sentence instead of Dziuba, who, unlike him, was an ill man and had a family to support.

This act cost Lukash dear. He was dismissed from the editorial board of Vsesvit and told that he would be forcibly treated in a special psychiatric hospital. Fortunately these threats were not carried out. On 12 June 1973 the Presidium of the Administration of the Union of Writers of Ukraine voted unanimously to expel Lukash from the Union.

For many years he was effectively under house arrest. He was persecuted in all possible ways and his works stopped being published, depriving him of means of existence. For a long time there was a police officer permanently stationed at the entry to his block who didn’t allow anyone to visit him.

Lukash was reinstated in the Union of Writers of Ukraine on the wave of Perestroika in 1987, when he was almost a dying man. In 1988 he became Laureate of the Maksym Rylsky Literary Prize. Within a few months, on 29 August 1988, Mykola Lukash died.

He did not live to see the publication of a large volume of his translations which came out under the title “From Boccaccio to Apollinaire” in 1990 and became a kind of monument to Lukash. The compiler of the volume, translator and translation theorist Mykhailo Moskalenko said that “in Mykola Lukash Ukraine was sent a Mozartian genius in the truest and most exact meaning of the word”. His colleague, prominent Ukrainian translator Hryhoriy Kochur described him by saying that “people like Lukash are probably born once in several centuries”.

1919 births
1988 deaths
20th-century lexicographers
Lexicographers
Literary theorists
Soviet literary historians
Soviet male writers
Soviet military personnel of World War II from Ukraine
Soviet translators
Translators of Johann Wolfgang von Goethe
Translators of William Shakespeare
Ukrainian translators
Ukrainian Esperantists